The Assembly of Independent Democrats was an electoral coalition that participated in the January 30, 2005 National Assembly legislative election in Iraq. It was led by Adnan Pachachi (a Sunni Arab former foreign minister who was on the Iraqi Governing Council until January 2004) and his party, the Democratic Centrist Tendency. The assembly included also Dr Mahdi al-Hafez, who was the minister of planning, Dr Ayham al-Samarie, former minister of electricity, Maysun al-Damluji, deputy minister of culture, Omar al-Farouq al-Damaluji, former minister of reconstruction, Atta Abdul-Wahab, ambassador of Iraq in Jordan, Mishkat al-Mumin, former minister of environment, Leila Abdul Latif, former minister of Labor & Social Affairs, Saad Abdul-Razzaq Hussain, and some other Iraqi politicians.

In the December 2005 elections the list joined the Iraqi National List coalition headed by former Prime Minister Ayad Allawi.

The list was represented in National Assembly by Dr Adnan Pachachi and Maysun al-Damluji. 

2005 establishments in Iraq
Defunct political party alliances in Iraq
Electoral lists for Iraqi elections
Iraqi democracy movements
Liberal parties in Iraq
Political parties established in 2005